Ghassira is a town in Batna Province, north-eastern Algeria. One of its most famous and most influential men was called Sheikh Mohammad Yekken Al Ghassiri (1915–1974).

Sheikh Mohammad Yekken Al Ghassiri
Mohammad Yekken Al Ghassiri was one of the founders of the 'Jameya el Oulema' (group of the knowledgeable). This group was a very important one during the Algerian resistance during the French colonisation and helped Algeria reach its goal of independence. After the Algerian independence, 1962, he served as the Algerian ambassador around the many Arab countries including Syria, Kuwait, Saudi Arabia. Along his way he accumulated not only the respect of these nations for Algeria's victory but tight links, which was from his exquisite diplomatic ability. Even until today there are numerous mosques and schools in Algeria named after him.

Life 
Mohammad Al Ghassiri was born in 1915 in Ghassira. Mohammad Al Ghassiri went to the school of Sheikh Giraldin in 1929. At a young age he memorised large chapters of the Koran. He then travelled to Constantine and continue his studies at the Sheikh Ibn Badis mosque for four years, 1932. He taught education in Constantine from the years 1937–1943. While in Constantine married his beloved Khadra Salhi (1926-2011). They had three children, Bassima, Abdelhamid and Bachira. All three followed in their fathers' footsteps regarding his ethos to education.

He later took charge of numerous schools since his passion for education was immense. He believed education was the key for freedom.

In 1956  he joined the liberation front, which was in Damascus, Syria. The representation was paramount and played a major role publicizing Algeria's case to the world. After the independence he was appointed ambassador to Syria, then Saudi Arabia and then Kuwait, where he remained ambassador until his death on 24/7/1974.

His legacy includes impact on education, religion, linguistics and literature.

Communes of Batna Province
Batna Province